The Insect Habitat was a science payload intended for the International Space Station as part of the Space Station Biological Research Program (SSBRP). The project was put on hold when Space Shuttle flights were interrupted after the destruction of Orbiter Columbia in February 2003.

The insect research element of the program was managed by the Canadian Space Agency, and the prime contractor for the Insect Habitat was Routes AstroEngineering, of Ottawa, Ontario.

Objective
The Insect Habitat would enable studies of the fruit fly to learn how microgravity affects  development, nervous system function, movement and behavior, growth, reproduction, aging, gene expression, mutagenesis from radiation and circadian rhythms or sleep/wake cycles. The habitat would have housed eighty-five separate colonies of fruit flies.  Each of these was divided into two compartments, separated by a rotating food cartridge.  Fruit flies, which have a short life cycle, tend to lay their eggs in their food supply, to provide their offspring with a source of nourishment after hatching.  After the eggs were laid, the food cartridge would be rotated, segregating the generations of flies so they could be studied separately.  Multigenerartional studies were possible in this way, if each generation was removed from the colony before its offspring's eggs were ready to be segregated.

See also
Scientific research on the ISS
Living Interplanetary Flight Experiment

References

External links
Biology Habitats on the ISS - NASA

Science facilities on the International Space Station
Space science experiments
Space science